R. v. Jordan was a decision of the Supreme Court of Canada which rejected the framework traditionally used to determine whether an accused was tried within a reasonable time under section 11(b) of the Canadian Charter of Rights and Freedoms and replaced it with a presumptive ceiling of 18 months between the charges and the trial in a provincial court without preliminary inquiry, or 30 months in other cases.

Background

Section 11 of the Canadian Charter of Rights and Freedoms states that  Prior to this ruling, a contextual framework set out in R v Morin was used.

Barrett Richard Jordan was arrested in December 2008 and charged with various offences relating to possession and trafficking. He was released with restrictive bail conditions in February 2009. The preliminary inquiry was set to occur in May 2010, but there was not enough time for the Crown to present all its evidence, so further dates were set throughout 2010 and 2011. In May 2011, Jordan was committed to stand trial. The trial lasted from September to February 2013, bringing the total delay between the charges and the conclusion of the trial to 49.5 months, of which 5.5 were imputable to the accused.

During his initial trial, Jordan brought an application for stay of proceedings under section 11(b), which was dismissed. His appeal to the Supreme Court of British Columbia was dismissed because it was judged Jordan had not suffered significant prejudice as required by the framework. His appeal to the British Columbia Court of Appeal was also rejected.

Ruling

Moldaver, Karakatsanis and Brown JJ., speaking for the majority, found that the framework set out in R v Morin caused significant complications and contributed to a culture of delay and complacency. They pointed out that the application of the framework was unpredictable, relied on the notion of prejudice, which is "confusing, hard to prove, and highly subjective", didn't encourage the courts and parties to prevent delays, and was unduly complex.

They proposed a new framework, based on a ceiling beyond which delay is presumptively unreasonable: 18 months for cases tried in provincial courts without preliminary inquiry, and 30 months for cases tried in provincial courts after a preliminary inquiry or in superior courts. Delays attributable to the defence are however subtracted from the ceiling (ex.: requesting unnecessary postponements, or an insufficient effort to accommodate the scheduling of court appearances), so an accused cannot slow the judicial process to their advantage. Since the delay in trying Jordan had been of 49.5 months, of which 44 were imputable to the Crown or to systemic delays, his appeal was allowed and a stay of proceedings was entered.

Concurrence

Cromwell J. considered that a stay of proceedings for Jordan should be entered under the R v Morin framework, and that the proposed new framework was not desirable. He wrote that:

Aftermath

The ruling had serious immediate consequences, as many persons who had already experienced delays exceeding the presumptive ceiling saw charges against them being dropped. It forced the Crown to change the way it works, including using the direct indictment procedure more frequently. This case decision ruling is informally known as the "Jordan decision," "Jordan ruling," or "Jordan rule."

References

External links

R. v. Morin. 

Supreme Court of Canada cases
2016 in Canadian case law
Canadian criminal procedure case law